Degenerate is the third studio album by British death metal band Trigger the Bloodshed, released on 24 May 2010. It is the band's first album to feature Dan Wilding on drums; it was produced by Trigger the Bloodshed with Mark Daghorn, mixed and mastered by Jacob Hansen.

Background
Degenerate was recorded in early 2010, self-produced by the band with Mark Daghorn, mixed and mastered by the Danish producer Jacob Hansen. It was the band's first album that introduced drummer Daniel Wilding, formerly from the Belgium-based band Aborted. Degenerate was also released in a six-panel digipack complete with a re-recorded bonus track of "Whited Sepulcher" from the band's debut album. A music video directed by Dave Kenny was released for the song "The Soulful Dead".

Reception

Degenerate received widespread critical acclaim from critics.

Rock Sound stated: "The record produces a hectic attack on the senses through the obvious avenues of rapid drums and hyperactive guitars and, though expected, produces immensely impressive results."

Terrorizer commented the album: "Opening with the lurch 'n' smash grooves of 'A Vision Showing Nothing' (...)", "Still firmly in the hyper brutal camp of Aeon and Hate Eternal, the Trigger sound rarely relents, but a new found sense of melodic inciseiveness has its hands on the steering wheel throughout the dynamic but dense likes of Hollow Prophecy , A Sterile Existence and wickedly bleak closing track Until Kingdom Come" and stated about the album: "Another impressive show of enhanced strength and maturity", (...) "Forceful, confident, and defiantly extreme, Degenerate is exactly what British death metal needs."

Track listing

Personnel

Trigger the Bloodshed
 Jonny Burgan – vocals
 Rob Purnell – lead guitar, backing vocals
 Martyn Evans – rhythm guitar
 Dave Purnell – bass
 Daniel Wilding – drums

Production
 Mark Daghorn and Trigger the Bloodshed – production at Little Clacton and Cherry Wood Studios
 Jacob Hansen – mixing and mastering at Hansen Studios
 Collin Marks – artwork
 Martyn Evans – layout

References

External links

Behind-The-Scenes Footage From 'The Soulful Dead' Video Shoot, Blabbermouth.net

2010 albums
Trigger the Bloodshed albums
Candlelight Records albums
Metal Blade Records albums